Thrissur District has four types of administrative hierarchies: 
 Taluk and village administration managed by the provincial government of Kerala
 Panchayath administration managed by the local bodies
 Parliament constituencies for the federal government of India
 Assembly constituencies for the provincial government of Kerala

Taluks in Thrissur district

The main legislative constituency in the district is Thrissur Assembly Constituency. Apart from the city constituency, there are 13 other constituencies from the district of Thrissur: Thrissur Assembly Constituency, Ollur Assembly Constituency, Guruvayoor, Chalakkudy, Kaipamangalam, Nattika, Kodungallur, Irinjalakuda, Puthukad, Manaloor, Kunnamkulam, Wadakkancheri and Chelakkara. There are two parliament constituencies: Thrissur Lok Sabha constituency and Chalakudy. C. N. Jayadevan is the Thrissur MP and Innocent (actor) is the Chalakudy MP. Thrissur municipal corporation is the only municipal corporation in the district. For administrative purposes, the district of Thrissur is divided into six talukas. These six taluk centres are administrative hubs for 151 villages in Thrissur.

Thrissur Municipality

Thrissur city functioned as a municipality since 1921 under the Cochin Municipal Regulations. In 1932, the new corporation building was constructed, and in 1972 new areas from other Panchayats were added to the municipality. On 1 October 2000, the municipal town was upgraded to the level of a Municipal Corporation with the Panchayats of Ayyanthole, Koorkkenchery, Nadathara, Vilvattom (part), Ollur and Ollukkara. The Corporation comprises three legislative assemblies Thrissur, Ollur and Cherpu. The city is administered by the Thrissur Municipal Corporation, headed by a mayor. The corporation is the second-largest city corporation in the state of Kerala in India. The city is the only local body in Kerala which directly controls power, water supply and solid waste management system in the city.

For administrative purposes, the city is divided into 52 wards, from which the members of the corporation council are elected for five years. The corporation has its headquarters in Thrissur city. The Thrissur Urban Development Authority and Town and Country Planning Department (TCPD) are the agencies that prepare development plan for the city.

Law and order

The city is the headquarters of Thrissur City Police and Thrissur Rural Police. The Thrissur City Police is headed by a Police Commissioner, an Indian Police Service (IPS) officer. The city is divided into three sub divisions, Thrissur, Kunnamkulam and Guruvayur. It also operates 24 police stations, including a woman police station and a traffic police station.

The Thrissur City Police Commissionarate is situated in Pattalam Road near East Police Station. The Thrissur Rural Police has its headquarters at the District Collectorate complex at Ayyanthole. The city is also the headquarters of Deputy Inspector General of Police, Thrissur Range, which looks after the law and order of Thrissur District, Palakkad District and Malappuram district. All the Superintendent of Police of these three districts come under his jurisdiction. The city also contains the  Kerala Police Academy, Central Prison, Viyyur, Police Dog Training Centre and Excise Academy and Research Centre. India Reserve Battalion, new commando unit of Kerala Police is headquartered in Ramavarmapuram. Border Security Force (148 battalion) have its first centre in Kerala in Thrissur only.

Thrissur Lok Sabha constituency
Thrissur is one of the 20 Lok Sabha constituency in Kerala.

Assembly segments
Thrissur Lok Sabha constituency is composed of the following assembly segments:
Thrissur Assembly Constituency
Ollur Assembly Constituency
Pudukad Assembly Constituency
Manalur Assembly Constituency
Guruvayoor Assembly Constituency
Nattika Assembly Constituency
Irinjalakuda Assembly Constituency

Members of Parliament from Thrissur

Indian general election results

Chalakudy Lok Sabha constituency
Chalakudy Lok sabha constituency is one of the 20 Lok Sabha constituencies in Kerala state (South India). This constituency came into existence in 2008, following the delimitation of parliamentary constituencies based on recommendations of the Delimitation Commission of India which were constituted in 2002.

Assembly segments

Chalakudy Lok Sabha constituency comprises the following seven legislative assembly segments:
 Kaipamangalam Assembly Constituency 
 Chalakudy Assembly Constituency
 Kodungallur Assembly Constituency
 Perumbavoor
 Angamaly
 Aluva
 Kunnathunad

Three legislative assembly segments: Kaipamangalam, Chalakudy and Kodungallur are in Thrissur district and four legislative assembly segments: Perumbavoor, Angamaly, Aluva and Kunnathunad are in Ernakulam district. Kaipamangalam assembly segment also came into existence in 2008, following delimitation of legislative assembly constituencies. Chalakudy, Kodungallur, Perumbavoor and Angamally were earlier part of the erstwhile Mukundapuram Lok Sabha constituency.

Members of Parliament

2009: K.P. Dhanapalan, Indian National Congress
2014: Innocent, Independent (politician) supported by Left Democratic Front

Indian general election Results

Mukundapuram (Lok Sabha constituency)
Mukundapuram Lok Sabha constituency was a Lok Sabha constituency in Kerala state in southern India. It was dissolved in 2008.

Assembly segments

Mukundapuram Lok Sabha constituency was composed of the following legislative assembly segments:
Chalakudy
Mala
Irinjalakuda
Kodungallur
Angamali
Vadakkekara
Perumbavoor

Members of Parliament

1957: Narayankutty Menon, Communist Party of India
1962: Panampilly Govinda Menon, Indian National Congress
1967: Panampilly Govinda Menon, Indian National Congress
1971: A. C. George, Indian National Congress
1977: A. C. George, Indian National Congress
1980: E. Balanandan, Communist Party of India (Marxist)
1984: K. Mohandas, Kerala Congress
1989: Savithri Lakshmanan, Indian National Congress
1991: Savithri Lakshmanan, Indian National Congress
1996: P. C. Chacko, Indian National Congress
1998: A. C. Jose, Indian National Congress
1999: K. Karunakaran, Indian National Congress
2004: Lonappan Nambadan, Communist Party of India (Marxist)

Notes

References

Politics of Thrissur district